In the United Kingdom, viewing figures – the number of viewers or households watching a television programme – have been recorded by the Broadcasters' Audience Research Board (BARB) since 1981. Prior to the board's formation, figures were conducted by different means, such as the BBC financing its own audience research, while the ITV companies sub-contracted theirs.

Most watched special events
The majority of special events attracting large audiences are often carried on more than one channel. The most watched special event programme of all time on a single channel in the UK is the 1973 wedding ceremony of Princess Anne, shown only on BBC1.
 Post-1981 figures verified by the Broadcasters' Audience Research Board (BARB)
 Pre-1981 figures supplied by the British Film Institute (BFI)

Notes:
 At least two Muhammad Ali boxing matches were reported to have been watched by at least 26million viewers in the United Kingdom: the Fight of the Century (Ali vs. Frazier) was reported to have been watched by 27.5million British viewers in 1971, and The Rumble in the Jungle (Ali vs. Foreman) was reported to have been watched by 26million viewers on BBC One in 1974.
 The wedding of Prince William and Catherine Middleton (29 April 2011) received a total average audience of 26 million viewers. This is a combined figure aggregated from the ten different channels that broadcast the ceremony. The highest figures of these were 13.59 million on BBC One, with an extra 4.02 million watching on ITV.
 Boris Johnson's address on 23 March 2020 was simulcast to 14.61 million viewers on BBC One, 5.80 million on ITV, and more than 6 million on other channels.
 The state funeral of Queen Elizabeth II (19 September 2022) was watched by an average audience of 18.5 million viewers on BBC channels.

Most watched programmes
The following is a list of most watched programmes, excluding sporting events and news coverage. The mid-1980s introduction of in-week repeat showings accounts for six of the top ten programmes. On this measure, the 1996 Christmas edition of Only Fools and Horses is, not including figures for repeats, the most-watched non-documentary programme of all time so far in the United Kingdom. It is the third most-watched single-showing programme of all time so far on a single channel, behind the 2012 Summer Olympics closing ceremony and the wedding of Princess Anne and Mark Phillips in 1973 (see below).
 Post-1981 figures verified by the Broadcasters' Audience Research Board (BARB)
 Pre-1981 figures supplied by the British Film Institute

Key
   Numbers with this background and symbol are italicised to denote aggregated figure with repeat showing.

Most watched films
These are the most watched films by total number of viewers (dates are when the films were broadcast, not necessarily when they were produced).

Most watched broadcasts by year
This table details the most watched programmes on a single channel based on average viewing figures.

Notes

References 

Top television lists
Television broadcassts in the United Kingdom
British television-related lists